The Ryleys School in Alderley Edge, Cheshire is a preparatory school for boys and girls aged between 1 and 11.

History
Ryleys was founded in 1877, above Alderley Edge's chemist's shop (pharmacy), before moving to its present site and changing name in the early 1880s. It was an all-boys school for 132 years until 2009, when it began accepting girls for the nursery and junior classes.

Until 2006, the school provided boarding facilities as well as taking in day pupils.

Alumni
Nearly all alumni in their final year have to date achieved reports and grades to meet basic entry requirements for schools with developed specialisations and/or across-the-board academic high achievement. These include the secondary education independent schools in Cheshire (see below), Manchester Grammar School, Stockport Grammar School, Cheadle Hulme School, and Shrewsbury School which are selective.  The school also teaches the subjects, some of which as options, for the varied entrance examinations of these schools.  These schools admit a varying intake of pupils at 11 — in the instance of Shrewsbury education there commences after the leaving age of Ryleys, at 13.

Pupil Laurence Jeffcoate was one of the three boys chosen to play in the stage musical, Oliver! on BBC One's I'd Do Anything.

Ben Jones, current professional golfer on the PGA and European Tour

References

External links 
School's Website

Educational institutions established in 1877
Private schools in the Borough of Cheshire East
Preparatory schools in Cheshire
1877 establishments in England